Zipporah, or Tzipora (Ṣīppōrā, "bird"), is mentioned in the Book of Exodus as the wife of Moses, and the daughter of Reuel/Jethro, the priest and prince of Midian.

She is the mother of Moses' two sons: Eliezer, and Gershom.

In the Book of Chronicles, two of her grandsons are mentioned: Shebuel, son of Gershom; and Rehabiah, son of Eliezer.

Biblical narrative

Background
In the Torah, Zipporah was one of the seven daughters of Jethro, a Kenite shepherd who was a priest of Midian. In , Jethro is also referred to as Reuel, and in the Book of Judges as Hobab.

Moses marries Zipporah
While the Israelites/Hebrews were captives in Egypt, Moses killed an Egyptian who was striking a Hebrew, for which offense Pharaoh sought to kill Moses. Moses therefore fled from Egypt, and arrived in Midian. One day while he sat by a well, Reuel's daughters came to water their father's flocks. Other shepherds arrived and drove the girls away, so that they could water their own flocks first. Moses defended the girls and watered their flocks. Upon their return home, their father asked them, "How is it that you have come home so early today?" The girls answered, "An Egyptian rescued us from the shepherds; he even drew water for us and watered the flock." "Where is he then?", Reuel asked them. "Why did you leave the man? Invite him for supper to break bread." Reuel then gave Moses Zipporah as his wife.

Incident at the Inn

After God commanded Moses to return to Egypt to free the Israelites, Moses took his wife and sons and started his journey. On the road, they stayed at an inn, where God came to kill Moses. Zipporah quickly circumcised her son with a sharp stone and touched Moses' feet with the foreskin, saying "Surely you are a husband of blood to me!" God then left Moses alone. The details of the passage are unclear and subject to debate.

The Exodus

After Moses succeeded in taking the Israelites out of Egypt, and won a battle against Amalek, Reuel came to the Hebrew camp in the wilderness of Sinai, bringing with him Zipporah and their two sons, Gershom and Eliezer. The Bible does not say when Zipporah and her sons rejoined Reuel/Jethro, only that after he heard of what God did for the Israelites, he brought Moses' family to him. The most common translation is that Moses sent her away, but another grammatically permissible translation is that she sent things or persons, perhaps the announcement of the victory over Amalek. The word that makes this difficult is shelucheiha, the sendings [away] of her.

Numbers 12

Interpretations differ on whether this  was one and the same as Zipporah, or another woman, and whether he was married to them simultaneously (which would make him a polygamist) or successively. In the story, Aaron and Miriam criticize Moses' marriage to a Cushite woman. This criticism displeases God, who punishes Miriam with Tzaraath (often glossed as leprosy). Cushites were of the ancestry of either Kush (Nubia) in northeast Africa, or Arabians. The sons of Ham, mentioned within the Book of Genesis, have been identified with nations in Africa (Ethiopia, Egypt, Libya), the Levant (Canaan), and Arabia. The Midianites themselves were later on depicted at times in non-Biblical sources as dark-skinned and called Kushim, a Hebrew word used for dark-skinned Africans. One interpretation is that the wife is Zipporah, and that she was referred to as a Cushite though she was a Midianite, because of her beauty.

The Samaritan Pentateuch text refers to Moses' wife Zipporah as "Kaashet" (which translates to "the beautiful woman"), rather than "Cushit" ("black woman" or "Cushite woman").

"Cushite woman" becomes Aethiopissa in the Latin Vulgate Bible version (4th century). Alonso de Sandoval, 17th century Jesuit, reasoned that Zipporah and the Cushite woman was the same person, and that she was black. He puts her in a group of what he calls "notable and sainted Ethiopians".

In the Druze religion
In the Druze religion, Zipporah's father Jethro is revered as the spiritual founder, chief prophet, and ancestor of all Druze. Moses was allowed to wed Zipporah after helping save Jethro's daughters and their flock from competing herdsmen. It has been expressed by prominent Druze such as Amal Nasser el-Din and Salman Tarif, who was a prominent Druze shaykh, that this makes the Druze related to the Jews through marriage. This view has been used to represent an element of the special relationship between Israeli Jews and Druze.

Art and culture

Like many other prominent biblical characters, Zipporah is depicted in several works of art.

In Marcel Proust's story Swann's Way (1913), Swann is struck by the resemblance of his eventual wife Odette to Sandro Botticelli’s painting of Zipporah in a Sistine Chapel fresco, and this recognition is the catalyst for his obsession with her.

Zipporah is often included in Exodus-related drama. Examples include the films The Ten Commandments (1956), The Prince of Egypt (1998), and Exodus: Gods and Kings (2014). She is the main character in Marek Halter's novel Zipporah, Wife of Moses (2005).

See also
  on Hebrew Wikipedia
 Sephora, cosmetics store named after Zipporah
 Tharbis – according to Josephus, a Cushite princess who married Moses prior to his marriage to Zipporah as told in the Book of Exodus
 Tziporah (Tzipi) Malka Livni – Israeli politician
 Tzipora Obziler (born 1973), Israeli tennis player

Notes

References

Further reading
Pardes, Ilana (1992). "Zipporah and the Struggle for Deliverance" in Countertraditions in the Bible: A Feminist Approach. Cambridge: Harvard University Press. 

Moses and the Kushite Woman: Classic Interpretations and Philo’s Allegory, thetorah.com

Book of Exodus people
Judaism and women
Moses
Women in the Hebrew Bible
Jethro (biblical figure)